"Slippin' Around" is a song written and recorded by Floyd Tillman in 1949. The most popular recording was a cover version by Margaret Whiting and Jimmy Wakely which reached number one on the Retail Folk (Country)  Best Sellers chart. It is a song about a person cheating on his/her spouse.

Tillman wrote a follow-up song, the same year, with essentially the same melody, called "I'll Never Slip Around Again" in which the cheater has married the one that he/she cheated with, and is in turn worried that he/she is being cheated on. Tillman, as well as Whiting and Wakely, recorded this song as well, as did Doris Day.

Recorded versions (Slippin' Around)
Dave Dudley
Jerry Lee Lewis
Benny Martin
Sammy Masters
George Morgan and Marion Worth (1964)
Ray Price
Floyd Tillman
Ernest Tubb
Jimmy Wakely and Margaret Whiting (recorded July 20, 1949)
Kai Winding
Perry Como (as "Bumming Around")
Betty Johnson
Joe South
Mack Abernathy (1988)

Recorded versions (I'll Never Slip Around Again)
Doris Day
Floyd Tillman
Jimmy Wakely and Margaret Whiting

References

External links

 
 

1949 songs
Margaret Whiting songs
Jimmy Wakely songs
Ernest Tubb songs
Floyd Tillman songs
Marion Worth songs
George Morgan (singer) songs
Roy Drusky songs
Priscilla Mitchell songs
Songs about infidelity